Witold Jedlicki (born 9 February 1929 in Warsaw; died 8 September 1995 in Jerusalem) was a Polish sociologist and journalist of Jewish descent, activist of the Crooked Circle Club, author of Chamy and Żydy ("Oafs and Jews"), in which he described the divisions in the communist Polish United Party Workers’ (Polish: PZPR), including so-called groups of Natolins and Puławianie.

See also 
1968 Polish political crisis
Roman Zambrowski
Władysław Gomułka

References 

Polish sociologists
1929 births
1995 deaths
Journalists from Warsaw
Polish emigrants to Israel
People associated with the magazine "Kultura"